CSQL was a software project, intended to be an open source main memory high-performance  relational database management system  developed at  sourceforge.net. It was supposed to provide high performance for  SQL queries and  DML  statements. As of 2022 the software was never functional and unavailable under an open source license.

It was configured to work as transparent cache for database management systems such as MySQL and PostgreSQL, circa 2009. As there is no disk I/O, in-memory databases provide a predictive response time which is suited to real time and near real time applications.
Version 3.3 was released in 2011.
It was promoted by a company called Lakshya in Bangalore, which existed through about 2013.

See also
List of relational database management systems

References

Vaporware
Relational database management systems
Free database management systems